Marco Köstler (born March 12, 1973) is a German musician. He works predominantly as keyboardist, drummer, singer and sound mixer.

Köstler originally comes from Waldershof. He was member of the Regensburger Domspatzen and attended the Domspatzen's music gymnasium (secondary school) in Regensburg in his youth.

Köstler is active in several studio projects, for example at Moodorama and bands as Schinderhannes (since 1997), Groove Suite, Bürgermeista & Die Gemeinderäte and King Banana (since 2009 U-cee & The Royal Family).

References 

German keyboardists
German drummers
Male drummers
21st-century German male singers
German audio engineers
People from Tirschenreuth (district)
1973 births
Living people
21st-century drummers
Engineers from Bavaria